The following Union Army units and commanders fought in the First Battle of Kernstown of the American Civil War. The Confederate order of battle is shown separately.

Abbreviations used

Military rank
 MG = Major General
 BG = Brigadier General
 Col = Colonel
 Ltc = Lieutenant Colonel
 Maj = Major
 Cpt = Captain

Other
 w = wounded
 k = killed

Army of the Potomac

V Corps

MG Nathaniel P. Banks commanding (not present)

See also
 Battle of Kernstown I

References
 Kernstown Battlefield Association

American Civil War orders of battle